Bridges Nanfan (baptised 25 March 1623 – 4 June 1704) was an English politician, MP for Worcester and Worcestershire.

Nanfan was the son of John Nanfan  of Birtsmorton, Worcestershire and his wife Mary, daughter of Edward Fleet alias Waldegrave of Worcester.

Bridges matriculated at Balliol College, Oxford in 1640, and became a student of the Inner Temple in 1648.

He served as a Commissioner for Assessment in Worcestershire 1664–80 and 1689, and a JP from 1678.

Bridges and Thomas Foley were elected unopposed for Worcestershire in 1681.

With court support, Bridges was elected MP for Worcester in 1685. The electoral agents of King James II recommended him for re-election, as a court candidate of "good character and interest". When Bridges' son-in-law Lord Coote joined the Prince of Orange in the Glorious Revolution, Nanfan disclaimed responsibility, claiming that his daughter's marriage had been made without his consent.

He died on 4 June 1704, and was buried at Birtsmorton.

Family
On 15 November 1660, Nanfan married Catherine Hastings, daughter of Sir George Hastings . They had one daughter:
 Catherine Nanfan (1665–1738), married (1) Richard Coote, 1st Earl of Bellomont, (2) Admiral William Caldwell, (3) Samuel Pytts , (4) William Bridgen

References

1623 births
1704 deaths
Alumni of Balliol College, Oxford
Members of the Inner Temple
English MPs 1681
English MPs 1685–1687
English justices of the peace
Members of the Parliament of England for Worcestershire